To Whom It May Concern is a 1959 album by Nat King Cole, arranged by Nelson Riddle.

Track listing
"To Whom It May Concern" (Nat "King" Cole, Charlotte Hawkins) – 2:58
"Love-Wise" (Kenward Elmslie, Marvin Fisher) – 3:56
"Too Much" (Bill Baker, Dok Stanford) – 3:20
"In the Heart of Jane Doe" (James Cavanaugh, Larry Stock) – 3:02
"A Thousand Thoughts of You" (Sammy Gallop, Ulpio Minucci) – 2:58
"You're Bringing Out the Dreamer in Me" (Johnny Burke) – 3:09
"My Heart's Treasure" (Ray Rasch, Dotty Wayne) – 2:56
"If You Said No" (Sammy Cahn, Paul Weston) – 2:56
"Can't Help It" (Fisher, Jack Segal) – 3:39
"Lovesville" (Ralph Freed, Harry Beasley Smith) – 2:39
"Unfair" (Belmonte, Cliff Lee) – 1:54
"This Morning It Was Summer" (Bob Haymes) – 3:58
Bonus Tracks included on CD reissue
"Give Me Your Love" (Mayme Watts) – 2:10
"Coo Coo Roo Coo Coo Paloma" – 3:04
"Non Dimenticar" (Michele Galdieri, Shelly Dobbins, P. G. Redi) – 2:50
"Bend A Little My Way" (Jack Wolf, Noel Sherman) – 2:23

Personnel

 Jerry Bock	Composer
 Nat King Cole	– Liner Notes, Primary Artist
 Nelson Riddle	– Conductor, Arranger

References

External links
[ To Whom It May Concern Summarization]
Other Summarization

1959 albums
Nat King Cole albums
Capitol Records albums
Albums arranged by Nelson Riddle
Albums conducted by Nelson Riddle
Albums recorded at Capitol Studios